"Top of the World" is a song by Nigerian singer D'banj. It serves as the fifth single from the album D'Kings Men (2013), a collaboration between members of D'banj's label DB Records. The song is the first single to be released through Sony Music's RCA Africa label and DB Records since D'Banj signed his multi-album deal with Sony Music Entertainment Africa. It was the official SuperSport anthem for the 2013 African Nations Cup, and peaked at number 10 on Pulse Nigeria's Music Video charts. It also peaked at number 4 on Afribiz's Top 100 music chart.

Music video
The visuals for "Top of the World" was shot and directed by Godfather Productions. It highlights the Super Eagles' tournament run at the 2013 African Cup of Nations. Moreover, it contains clips of D'banj's performance at the closing ceremony of the aforementioned tournament, which took place at the FNB Stadium in Johannesburg. According to OkayAfrica, "the clip features D'banj singing the song into a forest of mics while performing alongside a dreadlocked guitarist and rock drummer"  D'banj dedicated the song and its music video to the Super Eagles, who won the aforementioned cup after a 19-year drought.

Critical reception
"Top of the World" received positive reviews from music critics and consumers. Charles Mgbolu of Vanguard described the song as being "from the soul" and further said it "tells a dramatic story". BellaNaija added that with the release of the song, "Bangalee proves he is truly a force of nature in the African music scene." Monty Entertainment wrote, "If you listen to the songs he has released recently, you will notice that they are different from the D'banj we knew when he was still under Mo'Hits Records. D'Banj even displayed his vocal skills on this new track, and for a guy like him, it was not bad at all.

Track listing
 Digital single

References

2012 singles
2012 songs
D'banj songs